James Alexander Speers  (born 20 May 1946), known as Jim Speers, is a Unionist politician in Northern Ireland.

Speers works as a businessman and part-time farmer. He was elected to Armagh City and District Council in 1977 for the Ulster Unionist Party (UUP).

He was an unsuccessful candidate at the 1982 Northern Ireland Assembly election, but was elected to the Assembly the following year in a by-election caused by the disqualification of Seamus Mallon, a Social Democratic and Labour Party (SDLP) member of the 1982 Northern Ireland Assembly, who had been a member of Seanad Éireann at the time of his election. The SDLP called on voters to boycott the election, which Speers contested as the UUP candidate. He easily beat the only other candidate, Tom French of the Workers' Party, and served on the Assembly until it was abolished in 1986.

Speers contested Newry and Armagh at the 1992 United Kingdom general election, and took second place, with 36% of the vote. In 1996, he was elected to the Northern Ireland Forum, as a UUP representative for Newry and Armagh.  However, he failed to take a seat at the 1998 Northern Ireland Assembly election.

References

1946 births
Living people
Northern Ireland MPAs 1982–1986
Members of the Northern Ireland Forum
Mayors of places in Northern Ireland
Members of the Order of the British Empire
Members of Armagh City and District Council
Ulster Unionist Party councillors